JESNA (Jewish Education Service of North America) is the Jewish federation system's educational coordinating, planning, and development agency. A national, non-profit agency, it was created in 1981.  It closed in 2013.

Role 

Over the past twenty-five years (until 2013), the agency provided service and created partnerships with a wide array of organizations and individuals, including Federations, the religious movements, national agencies, foundations, and many educational institutions.

JESNA's goal was to increase the availability of engaging, inspiring, high quality Jewish education. Operating as a national resource, a community partner, a catalyst and a consultant, an innovator and a guarantor of quality, JESNA helped to: recruit and prepare new generations of talented, committed Jewish educators; create and identify models of excellence in educational practice; and assist communities and front-line institutions in improving their programs and performance.

JESNA worked closely with the central agencies for Jewish education that operate in more than 60 communities and the Jewish federations in more than 150 communities throughout North America.

Structure 

It was governed by a board of directors composed of lay and professional leaders in Jewish education from across North America, including individuals from the major Jewish religious movements.

External links 
JESNA publications on the Berman Jewish Policy Archive @ NYU Wagner
Grinspoon Steinhardt Awards for Excellence in Jewish Education
Records of the Jewish Education Service of North America.; I-75; American Jewish Historical Society, Boston, MA and New York, NY.
; JTA article: JESNA to shut its doors.
; Jewish Week article: JESNA shut down after 32 years.

Jewish educational organizations